Powwow Pond is a  water body in Rockingham County in southeastern New Hampshire, United States. The outlet of the pond is located in the town of East Kingston, but most of the lake lies in the town of Kingston. The Powwow River, the outlet of the pond, flows to the Merrimack River in Amesbury, Massachusetts.

The lake is classified as a warmwater fishery, with observed species including smallmouth and largemouth bass, chain pickerel, horned pout, and black crappie.

See also

List of lakes in New Hampshire

References

Lakes of Rockingham County, New Hampshire
Kingston, New Hampshire